Charti Lal Goel  (1927 – 16 August 2016) was an Indian politician. He was a leader of Bharatiya Janata Party from Delhi.

He was Speaker of the Delhi Legislative Assembly from 1993 to 1998. He was associated with Bharatiya Jan Sangh and was jailed in 1975 in the emergency.

He died at the age of 89 at All India Institute of Medical Sciences Delhi. He is survived by his wife, three sons, including Former Union Sports Minister Vijay Goel and two daughters.

References

1927 births
2016 deaths
Speakers of the Delhi Legislative Assembly
Bharatiya Jana Sangh politicians
Indians imprisoned during the Emergency (India)
Bharatiya Janata Party politicians from Delhi